The Jogi Faqir or yogi Faqir are a Muslim community, found in North India. They are also known as Madariya Faqir. The Jogi Faqir are Muslim and are one of the two sub-divisions of the Faqir found in Uttar Pradesh.

History and origin
The Jogi Faqir call themselves Madariya Faqir, as they trace their origin from the Sufi saint Jinda Jhullan Shah Madari. Their ancestor was Jay Pal, the guru of the Chauhan ruler of North India, Prithvi Raj, who became the disciple of the Sufi, Moinuddin Chishti, and was known as Abdullah Biyabani, after his conversion to Islam. The community have three sub-groups, Chaurash, Tappa and Athgara.

Present circumstances
They are found in the districts of Kanpur, Fatehpur, Unnao, Pratapgarh, Allahabad, Mirzapur, Varanasi, Barabanki, Basti, Sant Kabir Nagar and the city of Lukhnow. They were traditionally involved with begging and providing specialized religious services. Like other Muslim communities in North India, they are undergoing social change, and become more orthodox. They have always been Sunni, and many are now employed as village imams.

Jogi Of Sindh
Jogi are also present in districts and places such as Khairpur District, Tharparkar, Larkana, Shikarpur District, Sukkur, and Naushahro Feroze District of Sindh province in Pakistan.
The Jogi of Sindh are scattered in various parts of Sindh. One of the Rajpar tribe's subcaste is Jogi who are inhabitant in Thari Mirwah Khairpur. These Jogi are landlord, businessmen and other professions.

Jogi Rajpar 
The Rajpar are offspring of the Samma tribe and one of the sub-castes in the Rajpar is Jogi inhabited in Thari Mirwah of Khairpur erstwhile princely state of Khairpur, which is nowadays district of Sindh province of Pakistan. These Jogi (probably these Jogi have inherited the name Jogi due to their forefather named Jogi, in such cases it happens that some people or a community is known followed by their elder or a great grandfather name) are not involved in any practice of snake charming, begging or any type of Yoga; but these are landlords, educated who are doing various occupations such as teaching, labor, journalism, business etc.

See also
 Jogi (caste)
 Qalandar (clan)

References

Social groups of Uttar Pradesh
Indian castes
Muslim communities of India
Muslim communities of Uttar Pradesh
Thari Mirwah